The  Ronde van Midden-Nederland is a road bicycle race held annually in Netherlands. It was organized as a 1.2 event on the UCI Europe Tour from 2005 to 2013, and as a 2.2 since 2015.

Winners

References

UCI Europe Tour races
Cycle races in the Netherlands
1948 establishments in the Netherlands
Recurring sporting events established in 1948